Love on My Mind may refer to:
 "Love on My Mind" (Xscape song), 1994
 "Love on My Mind" (Freemasons song), 2005

See also
 "I've Got Love on My Mind", 1977 song by Natalie Cole